The following is a list of notable computer simulation software.

Free or open-source 

 Advanced Simulation Library - open-source hardware accelerated multiphysics simulation software.
 ASCEND - open-source equation-based modelling environment.
 Cantera - chemical kinetics package.
 Celestia - a 3D astronomy program.
 CP2K - Open-source ab-initio molecular dynamics program.
 DWSIM - an open-source CAPE-OPEN compliant chemical process simulator.
 EFDC Explorer - open-source for processing of the Environmental Fluid Dynamics Code (EFDC).
 Elmer - an open-source multiphysical simulation software for Windows/Mac/Linux.
 Facsimile - a free, open-source discrete-event simulation library.
FlightGear - a free, open-source atmospheric and orbital flight simulator with a flight dynamics engine (JSBSim) that is used in a 2015 NASA benchmark to judge new simulation code to space industry standards.
FreeFem++ - Free, open-source, multiphysics Finite Element Analysis (FEA) software.
 Freemat - a free environment for rapid engineering, scientific prototyping and data processing using the same language as MATLAB and GNU Octave.
 Gekko - simulation software in Python with machine learning and optimization
 GNU Octave - an open-source mathematical modeling and simulation software very similar to using the same language as MATLAB and Freemat.
 HASH - open-core multi-agent simulation software and package manager.
 JModelica.org is a free and open source software platform based on the Modelica modeling language.
Mobility Testbed - an open-source multi-agent simulation testbed for transport coordination algorithms.
 NEST - open-source software for spiking neural network models.
 NetLogo - an open-source multi-agent simulation software.
 ns-3 - an open-source network simulator.
 OpenFOAM - open-source software used for computational fluid dynamics (or CFD).
 OpenModelica - an open source modeling environment based on Modelica the open standard for modeling software.
 Open Source Physics - an open-source Java software project for teaching and studying physics.  
 OpenSim - an open-source software system for biomechanical modeling.
 Physics Abstraction Layer - an open-source physics simulation package.
 Project Chrono - an open-source multi-physics simulation framework.
 Repast - agent-based modeling and simulation platform with versions for individual workstations and high performance computer clusters.
 SageMath - a system for algebra and geometry experimentation via Python.
 Scilab - free open-source software for numerical computation and simulation similar to MATLAB/Simulink.
 Simantics System Dynamics – used for modelling and simulating large hierarchical models with multidimensional variables created in a traditional way with stock and flow diagrams and causal loop diagrams.
 SimPy - an open-source discrete-event simulation package based on Python.
 Simulation of Urban MObility - an open-source traffic simulation package.
 SOFA - an open-source framework for multi-physics simulation with an emphasis on medical simulation.
 SU2 code - an open-source framework for computational fluid dynamics simulation and optimal shape design.
 Step - an open-source two-dimensional physics simulation engine (KDE).
 Tortuga - an open-source software framework for discrete-event simulation in Java.
 UrbanSim  – an open-source software to simulate land use, transportation and environmental planning.

Proprietary 

 Adaptive Simulations - cloud based and fully automated CFD simulations.
 Akselos - reduced-basis finite element-based simulation software for structural and thermal analyses.
 AGX Dynamics - realtime oriented multibody and multiphysics simulation engine.
 20-sim - bond graph-based multi-domain simulation software.
 Actran - finite element-based simulation software to analyze the acoustic behavior of mechanical systems and parts.
 ADINA - engineering simulation software for structural, fluid, heat transfer, and multiphysics problems.
 ACSL and acslX - an advanced continuous simulation language.
 Algodoo - 2D physics simulator focused on the education market that is popular with younger users.
 Simcenter Amesim - a platform to analyze multi-domain, intelligent systems and predict and optimize multi-disciplinary performance. Developed by Siemens Digital Industries Software.
 ANSYS - engineering simulation.
 AnyLogic - a multi-method simulation modeling tool for business and science. Developed by The AnyLogic Company.
 APMonitor - a tool for dynamic simulation, validation, and optimization of multi-domain systems with interfaces to Python and MATLAB.
 Arena - a flowchart-based discrete event simulation software developed by Rockwell Automation
 Automation Studio - a fluid power, electrical and control systems design and simulation software developed by Famic Technologies Inc. 
 Chemical WorkBench - a chemical kinetics simulation software tool developed by Kintech Lab.
 CircuitLogix - an electronics simulation software developed by Logic Design Inc.
 COMSOL Multiphysics - a predominantly finite element analysis, solver and simulation software package for various physics and engineering  applications, especially coupled phenomena, or multi-physics. 
 CONSELF - browser based CFD and FEA simulation platform.
 DX Studio - a suite of tools for simulation and visualization.
 Dymola - modeling and simulation software based on the Modelica language.
 DYNAMO -  historically important language used for system dynamics modelling.
 Ecolego - a simulation software tool for creating dynamic models and performing deterministic and probabilistic simulations.
 EcosimPro - continuous and discrete modelling and simulation software.
 Enterprise Architect - a tool for simulation of UML behavioral modeling, coupled with Win32 user interface interaction.
 Enterprise Dynamics - a simulation software platform developed by INCONTROL Simulation Solutions. 
 ExtendSim - simulation software for discrete event, continuous, discrete rate and agent-based simulation.
 FEATool Multiphysics - finite element physics and PDE simulation toolbox for MATLAB.
 Flexsim - discrete event simulation software.
Flood Modeller - hydraulic simulation software, used to model potential flooding risk for engineering purposes.
 GoldSim - simulation software for system dynamics and discrete event simulation, embedded in a Monte Carlo framework.
 HyperWorks - multi-discipline simulation software
 IDA ICE - equation-based (DAE) software for building performance simulation
 IES Virtual Environment (IESVE) - holistic building performance analysis and simulation software
 Isaac dynamics - dynamic process simulation software for conventional and renewable power plants. 
 iThink - system dynamics and discrete event modeling software for business strategy, public policy, and education. Developed by isee systems.
 JMAG - simulation software for electric device design and development.
 Khimera - a chemical kinetics simulation software tool developed by Kintech Lab.
 Lanner WITNESS - a discrete event simulation platform for modelling processes and experimentation.	
 Lanner L-SIM Server - Java-based simulation engine for simulating BPMN2.0 based process models.
 MADYMO  – automotive and transport safety software developed by Netherlands Organization for Applied Scientific Research
 Maple - a general-purpose computer algebra system developed and sold commercially by Waterloo Maple Inc.
 MapleSim - a multi-domain modeling and simulation tool developed by Waterloo Maple Inc.
 MATLAB - a programming, modeling and simulation tool developed by MathWorks.
 Mathematica - a computational software program based on symbolic mathematics, developed by Wolfram Research.
 Micro Saint Sharp - a general purpose discrete event software tool using a graphical flowchart approach and on the C# language, developed by Alion Science and Technology.
 ModelCenter - a framework for integration of third-party modeling and simulation tools/scripts, workflow automation, and multidisciplinary design analysis and optimization from Phoenix Integration.
 NEi Nastran - software for engineering simulation of stress, dynamics, and heat transfer in structures.
 NI Multisim - an electronic schematic capture and simulation program.
 Plant Simulation - plant, line and process simulation and optimization software, developed by Siemens Digital Industries Software.
 PLECS - a tool for system-level simulations of electrical circuits. Developed by Plexim.
 Project Team Builder - a project management simulator used for training and education.
 ProLB - a computational fluid dynamics simulation software based on the Lattice Boltzmann method.
PTV Vissim - a microscopic and mesoscopic traffic flow simulation software.
 PSF Lab - calculates the point spread function of an optical microscope under various imaging conditions based on a rigorous vectorial model.
 RoboLogix - robotics simulation software developed by Logic Design Inc.
 Ship Simulator - a vehicle simulation computer game by VSTEP which simulates maneuvering various ships in different environments.
 Simcad Pro - Process simulation software with On-The-Fly model changes while the simulation is running. Lean analysis, VR, and physics. Developed by CreateASoft, Inc. Chicago USA
 Simcenter STAR-CCM+ - a computational fluid dynamics based simulation software developed by Siemens Digital Industries Software.
 SimEvents - a part of MathWorks which adds discrete event simulation to the MATLAB/Simulink environment.
 SimScale - a web-based simulation platform, with CFD, FEA, and thermodynamics capabilities.
 SIMUL8 - software for discrete event or process based simulation.
 Simulations Plus - modeling and simulation software for pharmaceutical research
 SimulationX - modeling and simulation software based on the Modelica language.
 Simulink - a tool for block diagrams, electrical mechanical systems and machines from MathWorks.
 SRM Engine Suite -  engineering tool used for simulating fuels, combustion and exhaust gas emissions in IC engine applications.
 STELLA - system dynamics and discrete event modeling software for business strategy, public policy, and education. Developed by isee systems.
 TRNSYS - software for dynamic simulation of renewable energy systems, HVAC systems, building energy use and both passive and active solar systems.
UNIGINE - real-time 3D visualization SDK for simulation and training. Supports C++ and C# programming languages.
Unreal Engine - immersive virtual-reality training simulation software.
 Vensim - system dynamics and continuous simulation software for business and public policy applications.
 VisSim - system simulation and optional C-code generation of electrical, process, control, bio-medical, mechanical and UML State chart systems.
 Vortex (software) - a complete simulation platform featuring a realtime physics engine for rigid body dynamics, an image generator, desktop tools (Editor and Player) and more. Also available as Vortex Studio Essentials, a limited free version.
 Wolfram SystemModeler – modeling and simulation software based on the Modelica language.
 Visual Components - a 3D factory simulation software for manufacturing applications including layout planning, production simulation, off-line programming and PLC verification.
 VisualSim Architect – an electronic system-level software for modeling and simulation of electronic systems, embedded software and semiconductors.
 VSim - a multiphysics simulation software tool designed to run computationally intensive electromagnetic, electrostatic, and plasma simulations.
 zSpace  – creates physical science applications

See also 
 Simulation language

References 

Simulation software
Computer simulation software